Sir Charles Edward James Louis William John Hamilton, 1st Baronet (28 May 1845 – 15 Nov 1928) was an English businessman and Conservative politician.

Hamilton was the son of John Hamilton of Liverpool and his wife Jessy Kemble. He was a Director of the North Wales Taper Co. and of McCorquodale & Co. He was a member of Liverpool Corporation for nine years and was Lieutenant-Colonel of the 8th Lancashire Rifle Volunteers. He retired from the volunteers in 1881 with permission to retain his rank. He was a J.P. for Lancashire and Liverpool City.

Hamilton was elected Member of Parliament (MP) for Rotherhithe in 1885. He held the seat until he stood down at the 1892 general election, when he was created Baronet of Cadogan Square on 21 November 1892. He was appointed High Sheriff of Cambridgeshire and Huntingdonshire in 1906.

Hamilton lived at Mayfield, Shooter's Hill, Kent. He died at the age of 83 when the baronetcy became extinct.

Hamilton married Mary McCorquodale in 1876, and they had two daughters, Winnie and Maud Kemble. He is buried at Greenwich Cemetery in London.

References

External links 
 

1845 births
1928 deaths
Conservative Party (UK) MPs for English constituencies
UK MPs 1885–1886
UK MPs 1886–1892
Baronets in the Baronetage of the United Kingdom
Councillors in Liverpool
Volunteer Force officers
High Sheriffs of Cambridgeshire and Huntingdonshire